The Spade is the sixth full-length studio album by Butch Walker, and the second released under the name Butch Walker and the Black Widows. It was released on August 30, 2011 on CD, vinyl, and digital formats. The lead single was "Summer of '89".

The album's single, "Synthesizers," was released on January 20, 2012. The music video for the song featuring Matthew McConaughey reprising his popular Dazed and Confused role of David Wooderson.

Reception

Critical
The album received a score of 78 on the Metacritic aggregate review site, indicating a generally favorable reception. Andrew Leahey of Allmusic noted that the album "explores the seedy side of Hollywood with equal parts power pop and heartland rock & roll", and that the lyrics of the songs in the album "focus on Walker’s own little world -- the girls he’s known, the drugs he’s done, the trouble he got into as an ‘80s wild child -- but Spade feels broader, fuller, more collective than those words suggest."

Evan Sawdey of Pop Matters was very positive about the album; even though he thought the album "doesn’t do anything new or particularly innovative", he found that "it's just a damn good rock album through and through" and that Walker had "finally wrote an album that is entirely in his own voice." Andy Gill of The Independent wrote that the album is "mainly brusque and strident raunch-rock, with an unappealing cajoling tone that virtually dares you not to find the songs clever and the hooks contagious. Which they aren't, particularly."

Commercial
The album hit number one on the Billboard Heatseekers Chart on its first week of release and peaked at number 105 on the Billboard 200, selling 5,000 copies in its debut week. The album has sold 18,000 copies in the U.S. as of February 2015.

Track listing

Personnel
Butch Walker - lead vocals, acoustic and electric guitars, piano, banjolin, mandolin, percussion
Fran Capitanelli - guitars, banjo, drums, backing vocals
Chris Unck - guitars, pedal steel, backing vocals
Jake Sinclair - bass guitar, piano, banjolin, backing vocals
Patrick Keeler - drums
Michael Trent - backing vocals
Cary Ann Hearst - backing vocals
Gavin Fitzjohn - baritone and tenor sax, trumpet
Dr. Steven Patt - accordion, dobro guitar
Adam Blake - album artwork and design

References

External links
 Butch Walker Official Website
 Album Release Information
 The Spade - on Rdio
 The Spade - on Spotify

2012 albums
Butch Walker albums
Albums produced by Butch Walker
Dangerbird Records albums